Aisam-ul-Haq Qureshi (Punjabi, ; born 17 Mar 1980) is a Pakistani professional tennis player who specialises in doubles. He is the only Pakistani player ever to reach a Grand Slam final, having done so in both men's and mixed doubles at the 2010 US Open, alongside Rohan Bopanna and Květa Peschke respectively. Qureshi has also reached seven further major semifinals across the two disciplines. He reached his career-high doubles ranking of world No. 8 in June 2011, and has won 18 titles on the ATP Tour, including the 2011 Paris Masters and 2013 Miami Open, with Bopanna and Jean-Julien Rojer respectively. Qureshi has also qualified for the ATP Finals in doubles on three occasions.

In singles, he reached his highest ranking of world No. 125 in December 2007, and achieved his best Grand Slam result at the Wimbledon Championships that year, reaching the second round. Qureshi is also the most successful Davis Cup player in Pakistan's history, with the team most notably reaching the World Group Play-offs in 2005, being defeated by Chile. He has played in the competition since 1998, and has won more matches for Pakistan than any other player, additionally being appointed captain of the team in 2022. Qureshi and Aqeel Khan have regularly spearheaded Pakistan's Davis Cup campaigns, partnering each other in doubles and also competing in singles matches.
Recently, He also started a talent hunting program to find the best tennis players in Pakistan

Early life
Aisam-ul-Haq Qureshi was born in a Punjabi family and grew up in Lahore, Pakistan; swimming, playing cricket and football being his favorite pastimes at his alma-mater Crescent Model Higher Secondary School. He started playing tennis late at age of 14, when his maternal grandfather and first coach, Khawaja Iftikhar Ahmed, a former 10-time national champion, took him to a tennis club in Model Town, Lahore.

His maternal grandfather, Khawaja Iftikhar Ahmed, was the All-India champion, in British India before Pakistan's Independence in 1947. His mother, Nosheen Ihtsham, was also a former women's tennis champion. At age 16, the ITF sponsored him for two years. He won the Pakistan International Junior Championships and went on to win the Casablanca Cup in Mexico and the LTA International Junior Championships in Roehampton, where he beat Olivier Rochus, Andy Ram, and Taylor Dent. In the World Super Junior Championships, he beat Andy Roddick. By 18, he was a top-20 junior player and decided to turn pro.

Aisam was educated at the University of Punjab.

Coaches
As a junior, he was coached by LTA. Aisam has been coached by American Robert Davis since 1998. Robert Davis has served as national coach for Peru, Panama, Thailand, and Indonesia.  As a writer, he contributes to the ATP's Deuce Magazine, Tennis Magazine USA, tennis.com, Tennis Magazine Australia, and ITF publications, as well as non-sporting publications and newspapers.

Playing style
Qureshi prefers the quicker grass courts and has had seen his greatest success on grass and hard courts. His playing style is serve-and-volley, relying on his serve to win him points by putting pressure on his opponents.

Sponsorship
Qureshi's clothing and shoes sponsor is Lotto. On 29 March 2008, Aisam signed an agreement with Pepsi for sponsorship of coach for one year. He became the first Pakistani sportsman who wasn't a cricketer to star in a Pepsi advert and become one of their brand ambassadors.

Awards and accolades
Qureshi teamed with Israeli player Amir Hadad during Wimbledon and the US Open tournaments in 2002. He is now a member of the "Champions for Peace" club, a group of 54 athletes committed to serving peace in the world through sport, created by Peace and Sport, a Monaco-based international organisation.

In November 2010 Aisam was appointed The United Nations Development Program (UNDP) goodwill ambassador.

Aisam was awarded the Arthur Ashe Humanitarian of the Year, for 2010 along with his doubles tennis partner Rohan Bopanna of India. Along with Bopanna, Qureshi received the 2010 "Peace and Sport Image of the Year" award, in recognition of their dedicated efforts to spread the message of peace through sport. Qureshi and his doubles partner Bopanna also created a campaign, "Stop War Start Tennis", with their goal to play a match on the border of India and Pakistan.

He was also given the Pakistan President's Award for Performance in 2002, the Salam Pakistan Youth Award by the President of Pakistan in 2007 and was runner-up for the 2003 Anne Frank Award For Moral Courage by the Anne Frank Trust, UK.

In 2011, he was awarded Lux Style Award for Most Stylish Sports Person. Being high-profile tennis star of Pakistan and alumni, he was invited to Crescent Model Higher Secondary School for ground breaking ceremony of Tennis courts in school.

Career

Juniors
Qureshi played his first junior match in August 1995 at the age of 15 at a grade 5 tournament in Syria had a successful career in junior tennis, finishing no. 7 in the world in 1998, which made him Pakistan's highest-ranked player ever on the international youth tennis arena. Qureshi turned pro in 1998.

Junior Grand Slam results - Singles:

Australian Open: 1R (1997, 1998)
French Open: 2R (1998)
Wimbledon: 3R (1998)
US Open: 1R (1997, 1998)

Junior Grand Slam results - Doubles:

Australian Open: QF (1998)
French Open: QF (1998)
Wimbledon: QF (1998)
US Open: QF (1998)

1998
On 25 September, he played and won his first Davis Cup match against Danai Udomchoke. Paired with Mohamed-Khaliq Siddiq, he won the doubles match. They helped Pakistan beat Thailand 3–2 for the Asia/Oceania Zone Group II Final and gained promotion to Group I.

On 28 September, he played his first pro match and got into the doubles final of a Futures tournament in Japan. His singles career also started well, getting into two Futures quarterfinals in Pakistan and Japan, and ended the year ranked no. 779.

1999
Aisam made it into the quarterfinals of his first Challenger tournament in Calcutta, but lost to Indian Leander Paes. At the Davis Cup Asia/Oceania Zone Group I quarterfinal match against Uzbekistan, Pakistan lost 4–1, with Aisam winning the only rubber. Paired with Dmitri Tomashevich, he won two doubles Futures titles in Turkey.

In the Davis Cup Asia/Oceania I Relegation Play-off final, China defeated Pakistan 3–0, which saw them relegated back to Group II. In October, Qureshi went on to win his first Futures singles tournament on the hard courts of Indonesia, beating Danai Udomchoke. In Vietnam, Aisam won a doubles Futures title with Mark Nielsen. This was followed up by another singles Futures win in Bangladesh on clay, winning in straight sets. Aisam ended the year ranked no. 365 in singles, and no. 355 in doubles.

2000

In January, he took Pakistan to a 3–2 victory against Hong Kong Asia/Oceania Group II quarter-final. Aisam then began to compete in more on the Challenger circuit, reaching the semi-finals at the Indian Oil Servo Cup in Calcutta in February, defeated by Tuomas Ketola. At the Davis Cup Group II semi-final Pakistan were beaten by Chinese Taipei 3–2, with Aisam winning two of his three rubbers. In May, paired with Dmitri Tomashevich, he reached the semis of the Samarkand Challenger in Samarkand, Uzbekistan. At The LTA Manchester Challenger, in Manchester, UK, Aisam made it to the semi-finals with partner Jamie Delgado.

In July, he took part at the Ted Open, at Istanbul, Turkey, where he made it to the quarter-finals, but was beaten by Oleg Ogorodov 4–6, 7–5, 6–3. Returning to the UK, he played at the LTA Men's Challenger in Wrexham, where he, along with Italian Daniele Bracciali, won in the final 6–4, 6–2. With that Aisam also won his first Challenger doubles title.

He won a futures doubles title in France with Israeli Noam Behr. Together, they participated at the Bukhara Challenger, in Bukhara, Uzbekistan, where they reached the final. Aisam won a futures single title in Vietnam, beating Jaroslav Levinský 3–6, 6–2, 6–3, and at the same tournament won a doubles title with Ashley Fisher. Aisam ended the year winning at the Neride Prague Indoor in Prague, Czech Republic where he partnered Kristian Pless.

He finished the year 2000 ranked 261st in singles and 211th in doubles.

2001

Aisam participated in his first ATP tournament at the Chennai Open in Chennai, India, with his partner Vadim Kutsenko of Uzbekistan. They won against Czech pair Petr Kovačka and Pavel Kudrnáč 6–1, 6–7(3), 6–4. However they were knocked out by Zimbabweans Byron Black and Wayne Black 2–6, 0–6. At the Davis Cup he was unable to help Pakistan as they lost to Chinese Taipei at the Asia/Oceania Group II quarter-final 3–2. He went to Mumbai, India to play in the MTNL ATP Challenger where he reached the doubles semi-final with Dennis van Scheppingen. At the Heineken Challenger in Ho Chi Minh City, Vietnam, he again made it to the doubles semis, this time paired with Denis Golovanov.

In April at the Davis Cup Relegation Play-off semi-final, he helped Pakistan defeat Syria 5–0. The Fergana Challenger, in Fergana, Uzbekistan, still with Golovanov, they made it to the semi-finals but failed again to progress further. In the UK, he played at The Wrexham Challenger in Wrexham; he progressed to the singles semi-final but was knocked out by Ladislav Švarc 2–6, 6–2, 6–3. Although he did reach his first Challenger level doubles final of the year, now with new partner Luke Bourgeois they fell at the final hurdle.

Asiam returned to Uzbekistan to take part in the Samarkand Challenger in Samarkand, where he made it to the quarter-finals in the singles, and with partner Kirill Ivanov-Smolensky, the doubles semi-final. He stayed in Uzbekistan to play at the Bukhara Challenger, in Bukhara and with his Dutch partner Rogier Wassen, they won the final 6–2, 6–4.

He won a single futures title in Thailand, beating Yeu-Tzuoo Wang 6–4, 4–6, 7–5. This followed a second in Vietnam against Yen-Hsun Lu. He rounded off the year with a doubles challenger title with Jaroslav Levinský at the 69th King's Cup in Bangkok, Thailand. Aisam ended the year ranked 251st in singles and 170th in doubles.

2002

In February at the Davis Cup, he won both matches, as Pakistan beat Malaysia 4–1. In the next Davis Cup tie against Chinese Taipei, he won all three rubbers as Pakistan qualified for the Asia/Oceania Group II final. Aisam won a doubles futures title in Kuwait with Tuomas Ketola. At the Fergana Challenger, in Fergana, Uzbekistan, he and Ketola were unable win in the doubles final.

Asiam qualified for his first Grand Slam at Wimbledon with doubles partner Amir Hadad. This pairing cause much controversy. In the first round they beat Martín Rodríguez and Tom Vanhoudt 7–5, 7–6(5), 7–6(2). In the second round, the Pakistani-Israeli pairing caused an upset when they knocked out 11th seeds Ellis Ferreira and Rick Leach 6–4, 6–4 6–4 to make it to the third round. They were finally beaten by seventh seed Czechs Martin Damm and Cyril Suk. Aisam was threatened with expulsion from the Davis Cup by the Pakistan Tennis Federation. Although Aisam did have support from Pakistan's Davis Cup captain. Aisam said, "I don't like religion or politics to interfere with sport. We're not here to change anything – politics and governments do that. We're just here to play the game and enjoy it." The ITF eventually intervened, forcing the PTF to rescind their threat.

At the West of England Tennis tournament in Bristol, UK, he won his first Challenger doubles title of the season with Dejan Petrovic. Next, at The Manchester Trophy in Manchester, UK, he won the doubles title with Karol Beck, although he was beaten by Beck in the singles semi-final. Asiam took his third doubles challenger title in a row when with Stefano Pescosolido he took the Hilversum Open title in Hilversum, Netherlands. In July at Wrexham, UK in the Wrexham Challenger, his doubles winning streak was broken when he lost the final with Daniele Bracciali. He also reached the single quarter-finals.

He partnered Hadad again at the US Open, where they defeated Mariano Hood and Sebastián Prieto 6–4, 6–2 in the first round. In the second round they faced fifth seeds Wayne Black and Kevin Ullyett losing 4–6, 6–4, 2–6. In September, Aisam returned to Davis Cup action when Pakistan overcame China 3–2 to be promoted to Asia/Oceania Group I. However, he picked up an injury and missed the rest of the season. Despite this, Aisam ended the season ranked 265th in singles and 102nd in doubles.

2003
Aisam and Amir Hadad picked up the ATP's Arthur Ashe Humanitarian Award. ATP chief executive Mark Miles said, "During a summer when fear and hatred garnered much of the headlines, Amir and Aisam-ul-Haq provided much needed relief with their simple message about tolerance through tennis." Aisam, partnering Hadad, participated at the Milan Indoor in Milan, Italy, where they were knocked out of the first round by third seeds Tomáš Cibulec and Pavel Vízner, 6–7(8), 1–6. At the Asia/Oceania Group I quarter-final, Pakistan were beaten 5–0 by New Zealand. Aisam went to Germany to play at the Warsteiner Challenger in Wolfsburg, where he reached the final with Austrian Alexander Peya.

He went to play at his second ATP tournament of the year, partnered with Hadad, at the Copenhagen Open. They lost to George Bastl and David Prinosil 5–7, 3–6. In May, Aisam won a doubles futures title in Uzbekistan with partner Justin Bower. They stayed together in the country to play at the Fergana Challenger in Fergana where they won the doubles title. This victory saw Aisam reach 89th in the world for doubles rankings.

At the French Open, he played with Daniel Vacek, but they exited at the first round at the hands of Rick Leach and Brian MacPhie 3–6, 3–6. At Wimbledon he and Hadad were beaten in the first round to Jiří Novák and Radek Štěpánek 6–7(5), 5–7, 5–7.

Asiam Partnered Rohan Bopanna at the Manchester Trophy in Manchester, UK, where they reached the semi-finals. They went all the way to the final and won the Colorado Classic in Denver, US. Returning to Davis Cup action in September, he helped save Pakistan from relegation as they beat South Korea 3–2.  With his singles ranking sliding, Aisam concentrated on playing singles matches, winning three futures titles, one in Thailand and two in India. He also won two doubles futures titles in India to round off the year, the first with Harsh Mankad and the second with Mustafa Ghouse.

Aisam ended the year ranked 493rd in singles and 187th in doubles.

2004

Aisam won a single futures title in India on February. He then reached The Wrexham Challenger doubles semi-finals with Vladimir Voltchkov. Aisam went on to win the IX Challenger Internacional de Salinas in Salinas, Ecuador with doubles partner Federico Browne. Next, at the USTA Challenger of Calabasas in Calabasas, USA with partner Cecil Mamiit, he reached the semis. At the Fergana Challenger in Fergana, Uzbekistan, he paired up with Harsh Mankad to reach the final. In Saudi Arabia, he won another singles futures title.

In June, Aisam played his first singles ATP tournament at The Nottingham Open in Nottingham and was beaten in the first round by Jonas Björkman in straight sets. He then paired up with Luxembourg's Gilles Müller and won at the XI Open International D'Andorra in Andorra. Aisam then took part in the Open de Montauban in Montauban, France, where he and Mankad reached the semi-finals. At The LTA Nottingham Challenger in Nottingham, UK, they both again reached the semis. Next, at The Manchester Trophy in Manchester, UK he partnered Lovro Zovko to the final.

Aisam reached the singles challenger semi-finals at the Arroyo de la Encomienda in Valladolid, Spain. In the same tournament he reached the doubles final with Michael Ryderstedt. After missing the previous tie, Aisam took part in the Davis cup relegation play-off final against favourites New Zealand. He assisted Pakistan in causing a huge upset when they won 3–2 to stay in Asia/Oceania Group I. He travelled to Nigeria and won another singles futures title. In his final event of the season, Aisam partnered Jason Marshall to the Audi Challenger semi-final held in Groningen, Netherlands. Aisam finished the season ranked 199th in singles and 136th in doubles.

2005

In Wolfsburg, Germany, Aisam played at the Volkswagen Challenger, where partnered by Lovro Zovko, he reached the final. At the Davis Cup Pakistan defeated Thailand, with Aisam beating Paradorn Srichaphan 7–5, 2–6, 6–4, 6–4. Going to the Heineken Challenger at Ho Chi Minh City, Vietnam, he reached his second final, this time with Orest Tereshchuk, but they failed to win the final. Aisam went to Mecca, Saudi Arabia to represent Pakistan at the Islamic Solidarity Games where he won 3 Golds in the singles, doubles and team events. At the Davis Cup he won all his rubbers as Pakistan beat Chinese Taipei to reach the World Group play-offs for the first time.

He returned to action in the Fergana Challenger, in Fergana, Uzbekistan, with Tereshchuk where they reached the semis. He travelled to Surbiton, UK to play at the first grass court event of the season at The Surbiton Trophy, where with Stephen Huss he made it to the semi-final. Aisam stayed in Europe to play at the Arpa Ceramic Cup in Reggio Emilia, Italy, and reached another doubles semi-final, with Mustafa Ghouse. Returning to the UK, he played at The LTA Summer Challenger, in Nottingham, UK for his third doubles final, paired with Jean-Michel Pequery, but Aisam still failed to win a final.

There was more struggling for Aisam at the III Challenger Diursa in Valladolid, Spain, where with Igor Zelenay, he could only get to the doubles semi-final. However, Aisam stayed in Spain to take part at the Open de Tenis Amaya in Pamplona, where with Zovko, they won the final and gave Aisam his first doubles Challenger title of the year. He continued his partnership with Zovko as they went to Uzbekistan to play at the Samarkand Challenger in Samarkand, but fell at the semi-final.

Pakistan faced Chile at the World Group play-offs. Aisam lost to Nicolás Massú 2–6, 6–7(4), 1–6, and then with Aqeel Khan in the doubles, they were beaten by Massu and Fernando González 1–6, 3–6, 0–6 as Pakistan fell to a 5–0 loss. In December, Asiam won a singles futures title in India. He ended the year ranked 450th in singles and 168th in doubles.

2006

Aisam played at the Davis Cup where he wasn't able to help Pakistan, as they lost to Chinese Taipei 3–2. He travelled to the UK where he won a doubles futures title with Jean-François Bachelot.

At the Davis Cup, Pakistan were beaten by India, despite Aisam winning both his matches. The season continued to be a struggle, however, in June he made it to only his second ever ATP tournament at the Ordina Open in 's-Hertogenbosch, Netherlands, losing out to third seed Mario Ančić, 6–7(3), 7–6, 5–7, in a closely fought match.

He finally reached his first Challenger final of the year at the Bukhara Challenger, in Bukhara, Uzbekistan, reaching the doubles final with Indian Rohan Bopanna, but lost in straight sets. Aisam returned to Davis Cup action, but Pakistan fell to their third loss of the year, losing to China. This saw them relegated back to Asia/Oceania Group II.

Going to India, he took part at the ATP tournament there, at the Kingfisher Airlines Tennis Open in Mumbai, and paired up with Leander Paes. They beat Paraguay's Ramón Delgado and Greek Konstantinos Economidis 6–4, 6–4. But they lost the quarter-final to third seeds and eventual champions Mario Ančić and Indian Mahesh Bhupathi 6–1, 7–5. In the first Indo-Pak tennis series, he and Aqeel Khan were beaten in the 5 rubber tournament 3–2. He stayed in India to play on the futures circuit, where he won a single futures title. At the 2006 Asian Games in Doha, Qatar, Aisam reached the singles third round. In the doubles, he and Aqeel Khan progressed to the quarter-finals where they were beaten by first seeds and eventual champions Mahesh Bhupathi and Leander Paes 2–6, 4–6. In the team event they were knocked out in the first round. In December, Aisam was declared ITF player of the month. Aisam ended the year ranked 417th in singles and 365th in doubles.

2007

Aisam started out in 2007 playing a number of Futures tournaments. He won two doubles titles in the UK, one with Stéphane Robert and the second with Purav Raja. Aisam won two more doubles titles with Jamie Baker. He went to the UAE where he won a single futures title and two doubles titles with partner Rameez Junaid. In Kuwait, Aisam won another single and doubles title, this time with Purav Raja. He qualified at the ATP tournament in Halle, Germany, for the Gerry Weber Open where he beat World number 11, and Wimbledon Semi-finalist Richard Gasquet, 7–6(10), 6–4, which has been the biggest victory of his career to date. Aisam was knocked out in the second round by Philipp Kohlschreiber 4–6, 3–6.

He went on to achieve a landmark in his professional career by qualifying the first time for the main rounds of Wimbledon 2007 Men's Singles competition. Aisam became the first Pakistani in over 31 years to play at a Grand Slam tournament and the second Pakistani to reach the second round of Wimbledon. He won his first Grand Slam match at Wimbledon against Lee Childs, 6–3, 6–4, 7–6, making him the second Pakistani player (the first being Haroon Rahim in 1976) to reach the second round of Wimbledon, before losing to Marat Safin 2–6, 4–6 and 6–7 (4–7).

At the Campbell's Hall of Fame Championships at Newport, he continued his good form as he defeated first seed Mardy Fish 6–3, 6–4. In the second round he beat Nathan Healey 7–6(2), 5–7, 6–4, to reach the last 8 of an ATP tournament for the first time. However, at the quarter-final Asiam was beaten by Dick Norman, 4–6, 6–3, 4–6. In the doubles, Asiam and Prakash Amritraj were knocked out of the first round by Wesley Moodie and Fabrice Santoro 0–6, 4–6.

Aisam followed up Newport with Challenger Series tournament in the UK at the LTA Manchester Trophy in Manchester and then The LTA Nottingham Challenger in Nottingham. Aisam secured the doubles title with Rohan Bopanna at Manchester. His red hot streak continued as he powered into the singles final at Nottingham, only to be bested by Australian Alun Jones 3–6, 6–4, 4–6. Aisam did however win back-to-back doubles titles by succeeding in the doubles final at Nottingham with Bopanna.

At the Castilla and León Open Challenger Series tournament in Segovia, Spain, his failure at singles did not seem to trouble Aisam, as he went on to lift his third consecutive doubles Challenger victory with partner Rohan Bopanna. The duo became known as the "Indo-Pak Express". Aisam returned home and picked up the "Salaam Pakistan Awards" alongside footballer Muhammad Essa and squash player Maria Toor Pakay.

Aisam then travelled to the US to take part in the GHI Bronx Tennis Classic Challenger Series in Bronx to play in the doubles competition. Aisam and Bopanna continued their dominance in the doubles game, as they prepared for the US Open, by winning the hard court challenger, and in the process, forming a 16-match winning streak that spanned four tournaments. In doing so, Aisam won his 50th title including both singles and doubles at all levels.

In order to fulfill his dream of playing at the US Open, Aisam needed to win three qualifying matches. He started out strongly, advancing to the third qualifying round where he met Scoville Jenkins of the US. Aisam pulled out before the third set due to a bout of tendinitis.

Although not fully fit, Aisam returned in time to play at the Kingfisher Airlines Open in Mumbai, his fourth ATP tournament of the year. It was also the first time Aisam was in the first round draw without needing to qualify or receiving a wildcard. Despite being the highest ranking Asian in the tournament, he was defeated in the first round by Serbian Viktor Troicki 6–2, 6–4. Aisam also resumed his partnership with Bopanna and easily won their first round encounter, beating Indian duo Stephen Amritraj and Somdev Devvarman 6–3, 6–2. In the quarters, they faced Iván Navarro Pastor and Sergio Roitman, who pulled out, allowing Aisam to reach his first ATP semi-final. The Qureshi-Bopanna partnership beat Lars Burgsmüller and Olivier Rochus, 6–2, 6–3. In Aisam's first career ATP tournament final, the duo faced third seeds Robert Lindstedt and Jarkko Nieminen, but lost, 6–7(3), 6–7(5). This loss ended their 19-match win streak.

At the Tarka Challenger in Barnstaple, UK, Aisam teamed up with Frederik Nielsen and won the tournament. As his singles ranks rose into the top 150, making him the third-best Asian player, he took part in the second Indo-Pak tennis series. He and Aqeel Khan were beaten in the 3 rubber first leg 2–1 but won the second leg 2–1 to tie the series. Returning to the Challenger circuit at the Malaysian Open in Kuala Lumpur, Malaysia, he was runner up with Bopanna in the doubles. Aisam went to New Delhi, India to play in the second to last Challenger event of the year, though he lost the doubles final with Boanna, he won his first Challenger singles title with a victory against surprise finalist Jae Sung An 7–5, 6–4 and with that reaching the top 130. Asiam spent the rest of December in India to prepare for the following season, with Sania Mirza, Mahesh Bhupathi and Rohan Bopanna. Aisam ended the year ranked 125th in singles and 90th in doubles.

2008

Aisam began the season at the Chennai Open in Chennai, India. He missed the singles qualifiers due to unrest in Pakistan, but made it in time to play doubles alongside Croat Marin Čilić. They defeated first round opponents Mustafa Ghouse and Karan Rastogi both from India, 6–4, 7–6(1). In the quarter-finals they faced second seeds Jaroslav Levinský and Michal Mertiňák, who they over came 6–1, 7–5. In the semis they were beaten by eventual title winners Sanchai Ratiwatana, and Sonchat Ratiwatana from Thailand 6–2, 2–6, 4–10. His doubles ranking rose to a new high of 82nd. Coincidentally, the Qureshi-Cilic partnership entered the 2008 doubles race ranked at ninth. Qureshi entered the qualification draw for men's singles at the 2008 Australian Open. He was seeded 16 but lost in the first round in a tight three set match. Back on the Challenger circuit, Aisam teamed up with Igor Kunitsyn and reached the Heilbronn Open final in Heilbronn, Germany.

Aisam went to the US to play at the Delray Beach International Tennis Championships. With Bobby Reynolds they beat Amer Delic and Rajeev Ram 6–1, 6–7(3) 10–5. In the quarter-finals they lost to first seeds and world number ones Bob Bryan and Mike Bryan 4–6, 4–6. He then paired up with longtime doubles partner Bopanna at the SAP Open in San Jose, and were knocked out of the first round by third seeds Max Mirnyi and Jamie Murray 4–6, 4–6.

Aisam and Bopanna were given wildcards for the Dubai Tennis Championships and defeated Paul-Henri Mathieu and Igor Andreev 7–5, 6–4 in the first round. In the quarter-finals, they squandered a one set advantage against first seeds Daniel Nestor and Nenad Zimonjić, losing 2–6, 7–6(5), 10–6. Aisam was called up the Pakistan Davis Cup squad and prepared for the hectic Asia/Oceania Group III schedule. During the Davis Cup, he was inspired form, as Pakistan won each tie 3–0 to gain promotion back to Asia/Oceania Group II. He went to Lanzarote, Spain and reached the doubles final of the VII Open Isla de Lanzarote with Gilles Müller, but were beaten 2–6, 6–7, however this saw his doubles ranking rise to 67th.

Then in New Delhi, India, Aisam took part in the New Delhi Challenger, and was knocked out in the quarter-finals to World No. 78 Yen-Hsun Lu 7–6, 3–6, 5–7. He teamed up with Bopanna for the French Open where in a tough first round draw they took on first seeds Bob Bryan and Mike Bryan for the second time in a year, but lost 1–6, 4–6. They both moved on to Wimbledon and knocked out Polish tenth seeds Mariusz Fyrstenberg and Marcin Matkowski 6–3, 7–5, 6–4. In the second round they lost to Marcel Granollers-Pujol and Santiago Ventura Bertomeu 2–6, 4–6, 2–6.

He went to play a Challenger in Dublin, Ireland and with Prakash Amritraj they beat Jonathan Marray and Frederik Nielsen in the doubles final 6–3, 7–6. Aisam returned to the US to play at the Campbell's Hall of Fame Championships where he took on Benjamin Becker in the singles first round and won 7–5, 7–6. In the second round he was defeated by second seed and defending champion Fabrice Santoro 6–7, 2–6. In the doubles, he and Bopanna were seeded fourth, the first time both have been seeded in an ATP event. In the first round they beat Tripp Phillips and Jim Thomas 4–6, 6–3, 10–2. They won their quarterfinal 7–6, 3–6, 10–7 Kevin Anderson and James Cerretani and followed that up by defeating Rik de Voest and Ashley Fisher in the semis 5–7, 6–4, 11–9. In the second ATP doubles final of his career, they faced Mardy Fish and John Isner, but despite being favorites, they lost 4–6, 6–7.

They then went to Indianapolis where Aisam lost his first round singles match to Wayne Odesnik 4–6, 5–7. In the doubles, he and Bopanna defeated fourth seeds Igor Kunitsyn and Dmitry Tursunov 2–6, 7–5, 10–6. In the second round Bopanna picked up an injury and retired at 2–6, 0–1 against eventual champions Ashley Fisher and Tripp Phillips. Aisam went back to playing challengers to Belo Horizonte, Brazil to play at the lBH Tenis Open International Cup 2008 where he reached the singles quarter-finals and in the doubles, he and Mexican Santiago González won the title. In Campos do Jordão, at the Credicard Citi MasterCard Tennis Cup, Aisam was defeated at the semi-finals in both singles and doubles. He and Bopanna played at the 2008 Legg Mason Tennis Classic they were defeated in the first round by third seeds Rik de Voest and Ashley Fisher 4–6, 4–6.

Aisam took part in the US Open. In the Singles he faced former World No 1 and French Open champion Carlos Moyà in the first round but lost 4–6, 7–6, 6–7, 2–6. In the Doubles he and Bopanna opened against Marc Gicquel and Sébastien Grosjean, losing 5–7, 3–6. He then appeared in the Thailand Open, losing in the first round to Swedish sixth seed Robin Söderling 2–6, 4–6. In the doubles, he and Bopanna lost 6–7, 6–4, 7–10 to first seeds Lukáš Dlouhý and Leander Paes. Then in the Stockholm Open, Aisam teamed up with Mario Ančić, however they were unable to get past the first round, losing to first seeds Jonas Björkman and Kevin Ullyett 5–7, 4–6.

He travelled to Kolding, Denmark to play in the Kobstaedernes ATP Challenger, reaching the doubles semi-finals before going on to Russia to take part in St. Petersburg Open where he partnered Rogier Wassen, but they lost to Igor Kunitsyn and Marat Safin 3–6, 6–2 9–11 in the first round.

Aisam then went to play in Challenger in Yokohama, Japan at the Keio Challenger International Tennis Tournament where he reached the singles quarterfinals, losing to former Asian number 1 and World No. 36 Hyung-Taik Lee 6–4, 4–6, 4–6. The Pakistani rounded off the year with a win in the Dunlop Challenger in Toyota, Japan alongside Frederik Nielsen.

2009

Aisam played in a future event in Sheffield, England, as the second seed. Aisam beat British Timothy Bradshaw in the first round 6–4, 6–0 but lost 6–4, 6–2 to Matthew Illingworth in the second.

Aisam lost to Matthias Bachinger in the first round of qualifying in the Heilbronn Challenger in Germany 7–6(4), 2–6, 3–6, and also lost in the first round of doubles with James Auckland. Next week, Aisam went to the Wrocław Challenger but lost in the second round of qualifying. Teaming up with Auckland again, he lost in the second round in the doubles.

Aisam went to the qualifying rounds in the Belgrade Challenger but lost in the first round to Julian Reister 7–5, 5–7, 4–6, Aisam was a break up in the second set and he also missed a match point in the tenth game of the second set as Reister was serving to stay in the match. Aisam teamed up with Lovro Zovko in the Doubles they lost in the final 6–3, 2–6 8–10. Aisam teamed up with Prakash Amritraj in the Dubai Championship but lost in the first round.

Aisam played in Pakistan's win over Oman in the Davis Cup which they won 4–1. Aisam won his first rubber and he won the Doubles match with Aqeel Khan, but did not play in the dead rubbers.

Back on the Challenger Circuit, Aisam travelled to Kyoto, Japan where he beat Chris Guccione in the first round 7–6(3), 6–4. He played I.Dodig in the second round, Aisam lost 5–7, 1–6, hurting his ankle during the match, but recovered to play in his Doubles Match. Aisam claimed the Doubles Title in Kyoto with partner M. Slanar. Aisam partnered R. Bopanna in the Bangkok Challenger and they reached the semi finals, but lost in two close Tie-Breakers 6–7(4), 6–7(5) to Elgin & Kudryavtsev.

Qureshi went to the Korat Challenger teaming up with Rohan Bopanna, where they reached the semi-finals. They defeated Levy and Okun 7–6(5), 3–6, 10–6 to reach the final, in which they beat Sanchai and Sonchat Ratiwatana 6–3, 6–7(5) 10–5. Qureshi & Bopanna had to play their semi-final and final matches on the same day. This meant Qureshi claimed his second title in three weeks, Aisam also was a semi-finalist in Bangkok.
Aisam went to the Johannesburg Challenger where he lost in the first round.

Aisam travelled to Busan, Korea to take part in the Challenger event. Aisam won his first round match against M. Semjan 6–3, 6–4, and in the second round Aisam won 7–6, 6–4 against T. Iwami to reach the quarter-finals. Qureshi travelled to Fergana where he lost in the second round in the Singles and lost in the Final in the Doubles.

He qualified into the main round of 2009 Wimbledon doubles, paired with Prakash Amritraj. After upsetting the 16th seeds Huss and Hutchins, they next defeated Junaid and Marx in the second round. They faced fourth seeds Mahesh Bhupathi and Mark Knowles in the third Round and lost 4–6, 7–5, 6–7, 0–6.
Qureshi lost in the second round in the qualifying rounds in Newport and lost in the first round in the main draw in the doubles.
Qureshi then went to Båstad for the doubles event but lost in the first round.
Qureshi then travelled to Indianapolis to take part in the singles qualifiers and the main draw in the doubles, where he was partnered with Sam Querrey. Qureshi won his first round qualifier against Joe Bates 6–3, 1–6, 6–3. Qureshi then faced L.Gregorc in the second round and won 6–3, 7–6 (7–4). Qureshi lost to Alex Bogomolov, Jr. in the final round 5–7, 4–6. In the doubles Qureshi and Querrey made it to the semi-finals before losing to E.Gulbis & D.Tursunov 6–1, 2–6 8–10.

Qureshi played in the US Open 2009 main draw, partnering with Jarkko Nieminen. They won the first round match, defeating A Golubev & D Istomin 4–6, 7–6(11), 6–4. They lost in the second round to second seeds Nestor & Zimonjic 7–6(5), 6–3.

On 3 November 2009, Qureshi with his partner James Cerretani defeated Roger Federer and Marco Chiudinelli in straight sets at the Basel Open Doubles. The final score was 6–4, 6–3. Qureshi said this was the greatest achievement of his career.  Qureshi and Bopanna teamed up for both Challengers in Aachen & Helsinki and they won both Titles which marked a good end to the year for Qureshi. Qureeshi ended the year Number 59 in the Doubles Ranking.

2010

Qureshi won his first ATP title ever at the 2010 SA Tennis Open in Johannesburg, South Africa, with his partner Rohan Bopanna. They defeated Karol Beck and Harel Levy, 2–6, 6–3, [10–5], in the final.

Qureshi and Bopanna then made their second ATP final of the year at the 2010 Grand Prix Hassan II in Casablanca, Morocco, but were defeated by Robert Lindstedt and Horia Tecău, 2–6, 6–3, [7–10].

In May, Qureshi and Bopanna were runners-up in the 2010 Open de Nice Côte d'Azur in Nice, France, falling 6–1, 3–6, 5–10 to Marcelo Melo and Bruno Soares in the final. Qureshi and Bopanna made the second round in the French Open, but lost to Michaël Llodra and Julien Benneteau.

Qureshi and Bopanna reached their first ever Grand Slam quarterfinals in the 2010 Wimbledon Championships. In the interim period between Wimbledon and the 2010 US Open, the South Asian duo made an appearance in the semifinals at the 2010 Legg Mason Tennis Classic, where they lost to eventual champions Mardy Fish and Mark Knowles after a dramatic straight-sets upset of second seeds Bob and Mike Bryan in the quarterfinal round. The duo had a disappointing second-round exit against Mariusz Fyrstenberg and Marcin Matkowski, the eighth seeds, at the 2010 Western & Southern Financial Group Masters shortly before their return to New York. In New Haven, Connecticut, at the last tournament before the US Open, Qureshi and Bopanna reached the final, where they again lost to Lindstedt and Tecău.

In men's doubles at the US Open, a 16th-seeded Qureshi and Bopanna again upset the second-seeded team, taking out Daniel Nestor and Nenad Zimonjić to advance to the quarterfinals, their second straight quarterfinal showing at a major tournament. They advanced to the semifinals with a straight-sets upset of Wesley Moodie and Dick Norman, the tenth-seeded pairing. In the semifinal, they ousted Eduardo Schwank and Horacio Zeballos, Jr., to advance to a meeting with Bob and Mike Bryan of United States in the final. Qureshi and Bopanna gave the Bryan twins quite a run for the title but eventually lost to them in straight sets, 7–6, 7–6.

Qureshi also partnered with Květa Peschke in mixed doubles and beat the eighth-seeded team of Vania King and Horia Tecău in the first round, eventually advancing to the quarterfinals (with a win over Yaroslava Shvedova and Julian Knowle), the semifinals (beating Gisela Dulko and Pablo Cuevas), and the final (beating Anna-Lena Grönefeld and Mark Knowles). In the final, Peschke and Qureshi put up a great fight but eventually lost to Bob Bryan and Liezel Huber in a straight 6–4, 6–4.

Both US Open showings are Qureshi's best yet at any major tournament in any draw, and his partnership with Peschke marks his first outing in the mixed doubles competition of a hard-court major.

2011

Aisam started 2011 by taking part in India Open in doubles, where he reached the quarterfinals. He then went to the 2011 Medibank International Sydney. Partnered with Rohan Bopanna. he reached the semifinals, where they lost to eventual champions Lukáš Dlouhý and Paul Hanley 7 -5, 4–6, 10–8. Then Qureshi went to the Australian Open, where he and Bopanna reached the third round, before losing to Michaël Llodra and Nenad Zimonjić, 6–3, 6–7, 6–7.

Bopanna and Qureshi's run at the Monte Carlo Masters ended on Saturday, when they were beaten in the semifinals by unseeded South Americans Juan Ignacio Chela and Bruno Soares, 2–6, 7–6(4), 7–10, in 95 minutes.

They advanced to the quarterfinals at Roland Garros, but lost to the Bryan Brothers, 6–7, 6–3, 6–7.
They were top seeds at Gerry Weber Open, which they won by defeating Milos Raonic and Robin Haase, 7–6, 3–6, 11–9.

He achieved the ranking of world no. 8 on 6 June 2011.

He reached the semifinals of the US Open doubles with Bopanna. Next, he won the Thailand Open doubles with Oliver Marach. This pair defeated Michael Kohlmann and Alexander Waske, 7–6(4), 7–6(5), in the final.

Aisam and Bopanna won the Stockholm Open, defeating Marcelo Melo and Bruno Soares of Brazil, 6–4, 6–3.

Aisam was also nominated for the Stephen Edberg sportsmanship award along with stars like Novak Djokovic, Rafael Nadal, and Roger Federer.

Bopanna and Qureshi compiled a consistent season, reaching the semifinals or better at seven tournaments in total, including at the US Open, where they were runners-up a year earlier. They also reached the quarterfinals at Roland Garros, losing to the Bryans.

The greatest achievement of the Indo-Pak express in 2011 was winning the BNP Paribas Masters in Paris. They defeated the pair of Julien Benneteau and Nicolas Mahut in the final, 6–2, 6–4. They reached the finals by defeating the third seeds Max Mirnyi and Daniel Nestor, 6–3, 7–6, in the semifinals and the second seeds Michaël Llodra and Nenad Zimonjić, 3–6, 6–4, 10–6, in the quarterfinals.

They became the seventh doubles team to qualify for the Barclays ATP World Tour Finals on 6 November. In their first round-robin match, they lost to Max Mirnyi and Daniel Nestor, 6–7, 6–4, 9–11. In their second round-robin match, they were defeated by Michaël Llodra and Nenad Zimonjić, 6–7, 3–6. In their third match, they were defeated by the Polish pair Mariusz Fyrstenberg and Marcin Matkowski, 2–6, 1–6. Since they lost all three of their round-robin matches, they did not qualify for the semifinal.

2012
In 2012, Aisam played with Curaçaoan Jean-Julien Rojer. They were seeded eighth at the 2012 Australian Open, but only made it to the third round.

In May 2012, Aisam and Jean-Julien Rojer won the Estoril Open Tennis Tournament Doubles title. After winning the Estoril Open, Aisam and Rojer went to Madrid unseeded. They caused an upset by defeating the Bryan Brothers to make it to the quarter-finals, but then lost to Bopanna and Bhupathi who were seeded seventh.

They went as tenth seeds to Roland Garros, breezed through to quarter-finals and then beat favourites third seeded Llodra Zimonjic, but lost in the semi-finals to the Bryan brothers.

Aisam-ul-Haq defended his Gerry Weber Open men's doubles title with Dutch partner Jean-Julien Rojer, defeating Conrad Huey (Philippines) and Scott Lipsky of the US, 6–4, 6–3. In the semi-finals, the top seeds defeated Poland's Łukasz Kubot and Russia's Mikhail Youzhny 6–2, 6–4.

"Many people thought that my win was a fluke last year. It's all come together and I’m very excited because it has just reaffirmed our confidence. Switching from clay to grass was difficult and I was feeling the pressure but we did well", the Express Tribune quoted him as saying.

"This win proves that I’m good enough. Both Rojer and I have continued the momentum we started in Estoril, then to the French open and now in Halle. I’m sure I’ll be able to improve my rankings by the time the US Open starts", he said.

Qureshi and Rojer played the UNICEF Open and the second seeds lost in quarter-finals.

Qureshi and Rojer were seeded eighth at Wimbledon. They won the first round against Wild Cards and passed over Qualifiers Bobby Reynolds and Izak van der Merwe but after having an easy draw they lost in the third round to eventual winners Jonathan Marray and Frederik Nielsen, 6–7(5), 6–7(4), 7–6(4), 7–5, 5–7.

On 4 November, Qureshi and his partner Rojer were defeated by Indian duo Mahesh Bhupathi and Rohan Bopanna at the Paris Masters.

2013

In 2013, Aisam ul Haq won the doubles titles with Netherlands partner Jean-Julien Rojer at the Sony Open in Miami, Florida and the Stockholm Open in Stockholm, Sweden. Partnering with Rojer, Aisam also reached the Men's Doubles Quarterfinals at the U.S. Open.

In singles, Aisam ul Haq won two total matches while playing for the Pakistani Davis Cup team. He defeated Daniel King-Turner of New Zealand 6–2, 3–6, 3–0 (RET) and Dineshkanthan Thangarajah of Sri Lanka 6–2, 3–6, 6–3, 6–3.

2014
In 2014, Qureshi won the doubles title with Rohan Bopanna at the Dubai Duty Free Tennis Championships, beating Daniel Nestor and Nenad Zimonjić. In Indian Wells, they went down in the first round against Roger Federer and Stanislas Wawrinka before a standing-room-only crowd, although they had been seeded sixth.

2015-2017
In July, Qureshi won the 2015 Hall of Fame Open in Newport, Rhode Island alongside British player Jonny Marray.

Qureshi entered the 2016 US Open (tennis) doubles event, partnering with Sweden's Robert Lindstedt where they lost in the quarterfinals to the top seeded French duo of Pierre-Hugues Herbert and Nicolas Mahut. Qureshi also played mixed doubles with China's Xu Yifan but they lost to Kazakhstan's Yaroslava Shvedova & Brazil's Bruno Soares in the first round.

In 2017 he won six titles: 
In January the ATP 250 tournament in Auckland; on 30 April, the ATP 500 event in Barcelona, Spain alongside Romanian player Florin Mergea; on 11 June, the ATP Challenger in Surbiton, Great Britain alongside partner Marcus Daniell; on 30 June, the ATP 250 event in Antalya, Turkey alongside  Lindstedt; on 17 July, the ATP 250 Hall of Fame in Newport, RI, alongside partner Rajeev Ram; on 1 October, the ATP 250 event in Chengdu, China alongside partner Jonathan Erlich.

2018-2020
In 2018, Qureshi did not win any major tournaments, but reached the quarterfinals of the 2018 Australian Open with Marcin Matkowski losing to the Bryan brothers and the final at the 2018 Barcelona Open Banco Sabadell with Jean-Julien Rojer.

In June 2019, Qureshi won two ATP Challenger Tour in Ilkey and in Nottingham, Great Britain alongside partner Santiago Gonzalez. They also won the 2019 U.S. Men's Clay Court Championships.

On 16 February 2020, Qureshi won the ATP 250 event 2020 New York Open alongside partner Dominic Inglot.

2021-2022
In 2021 he reached two more ATP 250 finals at the Emilia-Romagna Open and Stockholm Open with Austria's Oliver Marach and Rojer respectively.

He reached the ATP final at the 2022 Melbourne Summer Set 1 partnering new partner Aleksandr Nedovyesov.

At the 2022 Australian Open he again partnered with Nedoyesov where they defeated seventh seeded pair of Nicolas Mahut and Fabrice Martin.
At the 2022 Delray Beach Open he reached his second ATP final for the year with Nedovyesov.

Personal life
He married Faha Makhdum, a British woman of Pakistani origin, on 17 December 2011. In July 2012, it was rumored that Aisam and Faha had parted ways. Both families denied the news but later the couple announced their break-up. Makhdum said that they had not much time together during their marriage because of the busy schedule of tennis activities her husband had, which made her neglected as a wife for around thirty-eight weeks a year.

Career statistics

Grand Slam tournament performance timelines

Doubles

Mixed doubles

Grand Slam tournament finals

Doubles: 1 (1 runner-up)

Mixed doubles: 1 (1 runner-up)

References

External links

 
 
 
 
 

1980 births
Pakistani male tennis players
Punjabi people
Pakistani people of Kashmiri descent
Living people
Cricketers from Lahore
Tennis players at the 2010 Commonwealth Games
Recipients of the Pride of Performance
University of the Punjab alumni
Tennis players at the 1998 Asian Games
Tennis players at the 2006 Asian Games
Asian Games competitors for Pakistan
South Asian Games silver medalists for Pakistan
South Asian Games bronze medalists for Pakistan
South Asian Games medalists in tennis
Commonwealth Games competitors for Pakistan
Islamic Solidarity Games competitors for Pakistan
Islamic Solidarity Games medalists in tennis
People from Lahore